Bedwellty Pits Halt railway station was a station on the Sirhowy Railway. It was initially spelled Bedwelty, then known as Bedwellty Pits, and finally Bedwellty Pits Halt. It consisted of 2 wooden platforms to serve the workforce of the local colliery, which is 2 miles south of Tredegar in the Sirhowy Valley.

History
Bedwellty Pits Colliery was opened in 1850, and was served by sidings connected to the Sirhowy Railway. The station was opened in 1866 by the Sirhowy Railway after the conversion of the Sirhowy Tramroad to a standard gauge railway. It was closed to passenger traffic on 13 June 1960.

Present day

The route now forms part of National Cycle Route 467; there are no remains of the station at the site.

Notes

References

Route

Former London and North Western Railway stations

Disused railway stations in Blaenau Gwent
Railway stations in Great Britain opened in 1866
Railway stations in Great Britain closed in 1960
1960 disestablishments in Wales